Rhigognostis kuusamoensis is a species of moth belonging to the family Plutellidae.

It is native to Northern Europe.

References

Plutellidae
Moths described in 1989